The University Avenue Bridge is a double-leaf bascule bridge crossing the Schuylkill River in Philadelphia, Pennsylvania. The four-lane bridge links University Avenue in West Philadelphia with South 34th Street in the Grays Ferry section of South Philadelphia.

Built in 1930, the bridge was placed on the National Register of Historic Places on May 26, 1994.

Gallery

See also
List of bridges documented by the Historic American Engineering Record in Pennsylvania
List of crossings of the Schuylkill River

References

External links
1917 drawing of proposed bridge, PhillyHistory.org
1929 Photo of unfinished bridge, PhillyHistory.org
1929 photo of drawbridge open, PhillyHistory.org
1950 photo of bridge, PhillyHistory.org

Bridges on the National Register of Historic Places in Philadelphia
Bascule bridges in the United States
Bridges over the Schuylkill River
Historic American Engineering Record in Philadelphia
South Philadelphia
West Philadelphia
Road bridges on the National Register of Historic Places in Pennsylvania
Steel bridges in the United States
Bridges in Philadelphia